Park Hyun-sun (born 22 January 1988) is a South Korean synchronized swimmer. She competed in the women's duet at the 2012 Summer Olympics with her younger sister Park Hyun-ha.

References

External links

1988 births
Living people
South Korean synchronized swimmers
Olympic synchronized swimmers of South Korea
Synchronized swimmers at the 2012 Summer Olympics
Yonsei University alumni
Asian Games medalists in artistic swimming
Artistic swimmers at the 2010 Asian Games
Medalists at the 2010 Asian Games
Asian Games bronze medalists for South Korea